The (Society of the) Iobakchoi (or Iobacchoi) was a second to third century CE Athenian cult association devoted to Dionysus (Bacchus), known from the Iobakchoi inscription (IG, II2, 1368, Athens, 164/165 CE; AGRW ID# 496).

Notes

External links 

 Regulations of the Iobacchoi (164/165 CE)

Organizations established in the 2nd century
2nd-century establishments
Religious organizations established in the 1st millennium
Culture of Ancient Athens
Cult of Dionysus